Mario Brnjac (October 3, 1944 – September 24, 2007) was a Croatian football player.

Club career
Born in Sveta Nedelja, Istria, as a player he spent nine seasons with HNK Rijeka. He was one of the key defenders for Rijeka during much of the 1960s and the early 1970s, collecting over 300 caps. In 1972, he moved to Borac Banja Luka where he played for four more years before retiring.

Brnjac died age 62 in September 2007.

References

1944 births
2007 deaths
People from Sveta Nedelja, Istria
Association football defenders
Yugoslav footballers
HNK Rijeka players
FK Borac Banja Luka players
Yugoslav First League players